Unión Club Ceares is a Spanish football team based in the neighbourhood of Ceares, Gijón, in the autonomous community of Asturias. Founded in 1946, it plays in Segunda División RFEF – Group 1, holding home games at Campo de La Cruz, which has a capacity of 1,500 spectators.

History

Early years
The club was founded in 1946 as a merger of two clubs: Fortuna and Reconquista. In 1965 and being Mr. José Ramón Elvira Sastre the president, UC Ceares promotes for the first time to Tercera División, but finished in the last position, being subsequently relegated. Ceares continued playing in regional divisions until 1986, year that the team returned to Tercera División and played in it two years.

2000s: Comeback to Tercera División
In the seasons 2001–02 and 2002–03, Ceares achieved two consecutive promotions from Primera Regional to Tercera División with Rogelio García as head coach. He would coach UC Ceares during six consecutive seasons, with a break in 2007, remaining in Tercera starting the longest streak of the club in this division.

In 2007, former Real Sporting footballer José Antonio Redondo replaced him until 2009, when he resigned. With Redondo at the helm, on 5 April 2008, Ceares earned a 1–1 away draw in the last minute against Asturian powerhouse Oviedo and qualified for the semi-finals of the Asturian tournament of the RFEF Cup, where they were eliminated by Langreo.

Rogelio would take the team again until the end of the 2008–09 season. After that season, Florentino Angulo was hired as new manager. Angulo managed Ceares until 2012.

2010s: "People's football" project and promotion playoffs
Before the 2011–12 season, a new board takes the control of the club and gives it a new philosophy based on a claim of social and people's sport and criticism the actual business in football. For this philosophy, Ceares board inspired on English football and clubs like St. Pauli or United of Manchester.

The 2013–14 season was the 14th of the club in this league (the 11th consecutive one) and the second of Nacho Cabo as manager. Ceares started the season with only one defeat in the first fifteen games, earning 34 points, which allowed the club to lead the table during two weeks, after a win at L'Entregu CF by 1–3 in its 500th game in Tercera.

Finally, Ceares qualified for the promotion playoffs to Segunda División B in the last week, after winning by 0–3 to Luarca CF. The team finished in the third position with 74 points, 21 wins, 54 goals scored and only 31 allowed. All these numbers were records in the history of the club.

In the first round, Ceares dropped Águilas by 2–1 in the aggregate. In the first leg, the brickers earned a draw by 1–1 thanks to a goal of Pablo Martínez in the 87th minute. Martínez also scored the only goal in the second game. This was the second time La Cruz registered an attendance of 1,500 fans. The first one was in 2003, when Oviedo visited the field for the first time.

Ceares faced Trival Valderas, the champion of the group of Madrid, in the second round, but was widely defeated in the first leg, played in Gijón, by 0–3. The team earned a 2–2 draw at Alcorcón, in a game where Borja Noval missed a penalty when the game was 2–1 for the brickers.

On 30 August 2014, Bryan Jiménez became the first Ceares player who played an international game. He made his debut with the Dominican Republic national team in a lost friendly against El Salvador.

In 2015, Ceares signed a collaboration agreement with women's football club Gijón FF for sharing La Cruz stadium and to create a youth academy for boys and girls.

2020–present: promotion to Segunda División RFEF
In the 2020–21 season, the one with a two-staged format, Ceares ended the first leg of the regular season as champion of one of the two subgroups. On 2 May 2021, Ceares had the option to directly promote to the newly created Segunda División RFEF, that would replace the Segunda División B, by defeating San Martín at home. However, they had to wait one more week as they were widely beaten by 1–4. Seven days later, Ceares clinched the Tercera División title and promotion after beating 0–2 in a do-or-die match at L'Entregu.

The first win in the new league arrived at round 3, after defeating Arenteiro by 2–0. However, a long streak of losses quickly demoted the team to the last position. On 30 November 2021, Ceares made its debut in the Copa del Rey, by facing local powerhouse Sporting de Gijón. The match was played at El Molinón, as La Cruz did not meet the requirements of the RFEF for hosting matches of this competition, and finished with a 0–1 defeat.

Stadium

During the 1960s, UC Ceares played its matches in the old pitch of Los Fresno, in Viesques, neighbourhood of Gijón. This location is today occupied by a school. During some years, due to not having an own stadium, played its matches in several fields until the current Campo de La Cruz was built in the 1970s.

The pitch is made of natural grass and has dimensions of 99 by 65 meters. The stadium has got a lateral tribune, improved in 2004, with 250 seats. It's located in Parque de Los Pericones in Gijón.

The stadium was used also by Gijón FF, for playing the 2005–06 Superliga Femenina, the only season the club played in the top women's league in Spain. It came back to La Cruz in 2018.

In April 2017, Ceares agreed with the Gijón Town Hall the renovation of the facilities and the construction of a second pitch made of artificial turf for Gijón FF and the youth teams of the club. However, due to some controversies in the city, the Town Hall preferred to build the second pitch in other area of the neighbourhood.

One year later, Ceares authorised Gijón FF to play its games in the women's second division at La Cruz.

In July 2019, the Town Hall of Gijón refused to continue with the project of the new pitch mainly for the women's team and only offered Ceares to renovate La Cruz by building a new tribune and changing the pitch of natural grass for one made of artificial turf. This proposal was widely rejected by the club members.

In 2020, the building of the lockers and club office and the kop, both located behind the goal, were reformed.

Kit manufacturers and shirt sponsors

Current squad

Season to season

Source

1 season in Segunda División RFEF
21 seasons in Tercera División

Awards and trophies
1 Tercera División: 2020–21

Statistics and records

In Segunda División RFEF

Updated as of the end of the 2021–22 season.

 Best position: 18th (2021–22).
 Record home win: 2–0 vs Arenteiro.
 Consecutive games undefeated: 2.
 Consecutive games without goals against: 2.
 Top scorer: Óscar Fernández (9 goals).
 Most games played: Héctor Zuazua (33 games).
 Coach with more games: Pablo Busto (34 games).

In Tercera División

Updated as of the end of the 2020–21 season.

 Best position: 1st (2020–21).
 Consecutive season in Tercera División: 17th (2003–04 to 2019–20).
 Record home win: 6–0 vs Condal (2017–18).
 Record away win: 0–4 vs Llanes (2012–13), 1–5 vs Siero (2019–20).
 Consecutive games undefeated: 13 (2020–21).
 Consecutive wins: 7 (2020–21).
 Consecutive games without goals against: 5 (2009–10 and 2020–21).
 Top scorer: Jimmy (47 goals).
 Most games played: Juan Carlos (295 games, including playoffs).
 Coach with more games: In Tercera División: Nacho Cabo (156 games, including playoffs).

Most capped players
Below is a list of the ten players with the most caps for Ceares in national leagues, Copa del Rey and Copa RFEF, as of the 2021–22 season. Players in bold are currently playing at Ceares.

Top goalscorers
Below is a list of the top ten goalscorers for Ceares in national leagues, Copa del Rey and Copa RFEF, as of the 2021–22 season. Players in bold are currently playing at Ceares.

Famous players
 Salvador Capín
 Francisco Javier Castaño
 Adrián Colunga
 Dani Peláez
 Josu Uribe
 Bryan Jiménez

Head coaches

All official games are counted.

Memorial Pepe Ortiz
Since 2011, UC Ceares starts the pre-season playing a friendly trophy called Memorial Pepe Ortiz in hommage of the former player of Sporting de Gijón from 1949 to 1963, considered as the best player of the history of the neighbourhood.

Agreed and affiliated teams

Aboño

Since July 2019, Cultural Deportiva de Aboño acts as the reserve team of Ceares.

The club, founded in 1929 in Aboño, Carrió, Carreño, currently plays in Segunda Regional, seventh and last tier, and in its best years reached the Regional Preferente, fifth division.

Season to season (as reserve team)

Gijón FF

Gijón Fútbol Femenino is the only women's football team of Gijón that played in the Superliga.

In 2015, Gijón FF started to act as de facto's women's section of Ceares and both created the Mixed Football Academy.

Veriña
Veriña Club de Fútbol, located in the namesake parish, is one of the most important youth football teams in the city. The collaboration agreement started in 2020, during the months Ceares had to play at Estadio Lloreda due to the improvement works at La Cruz.

References

External links
Official website 
Futbolme team profile 
BDFutbol team profile

Football clubs in Asturias
Association football clubs established in 1946
1946 establishments in Spain
Sport in Gijón